Donji Dubovik may refer to:
 Donji Dubovik (Krupa na Uni), a village in Krupa na Uni municipality, Bosnia and Herzegovina
 Donji Dubovik (Višegrad), a village in Višegrad municipality, Bosnia and Herzegovina